Hosea Emiliano Gear (born 16 March 1984) is a former New Zealand rugby union player who played as a wing. He has also played 14 international matches for New Zealand.

Early life
The younger brother of Rico Gear, he was born in Gisborne, New Zealand, where he attended Gisborne Boys' High School. He is of the Ngāti Porou Iwi.

Rugby career
He currently holds the record for most tries in a provincial season with 14 in the 2008 Air New Zealand Cup. He has played for the New Zealand Maori. After his outstanding performance for Wellington in the 2008 Air New Zealand Cup, he was chosen for the All Blacks to tour Hong Kong and Europe on 26 October 2008 and made his debut against Australia in the Bledisloe Cup on 1 November. In 2010 Gear made his Rugby Sevens debut in the 2010 Commonwealth Games for New Zealand and was chosen for the All Blacks end of year tour. After an injury to Cory Jane, Gear was given a starting spot against England, a game in which he scored the first try. The following week vs Scotland Gear once again scored the first try and then went on later to score another in the All Blacks 49–3 win. Again Gear scored the first Try in the All Blacks vs Wales game, also going on to score another to top off a great international year.

Gear initially narrowly missed selection to the New Zealand squad for the 2011 Rugby World Cup. However, after a string of injuries to the All Black's squad, Gear was called up prior to the semi final match against the Wallabies. He was not named in the twenty-two man team to play the match. He received a World Cup winner's medal after the final which New Zealand won 8–7, but he was not in the match-day 22.

Hosea Gear ended his rugby career when he transitioned from a player-coach to first XV coach for East Coast in late 2021. He also coached Ngati Porou East Coast rugby team.

References

External links 
 Highlanders profile
 

1984 births
Living people
New Zealand rugby union players
Rugby union players from Gisborne, New Zealand
People educated at Gisborne Boys' High School
New Zealand international rugby union players
Māori All Blacks players
Ngāti Porou people
Hurricanes (rugby union) players
Highlanders (rugby union) players
Chiefs (rugby union) players
Wellington rugby union players
North Harbour rugby union players
Mie Honda Heat players
Stade Toulousain players
ASM Clermont Auvergne players
New Zealand expatriate rugby union players
Expatriate rugby union players in France
Expatriate rugby union players in Japan
New Zealand expatriate sportspeople in France
New Zealand expatriate sportspeople in Japan
New Zealand international rugby sevens players
New Zealand male rugby sevens players
Commonwealth Games gold medallists for New Zealand
Commonwealth Games rugby sevens players of New Zealand
Rugby sevens players at the 2010 Commonwealth Games
Commonwealth Games medallists in rugby sevens
Victoria University of Wellington alumni
Medallists at the 2010 Commonwealth Games